A regular diatonic tuning is any musical scale consisting of "tones" (T) and "semitones" (S) arranged in any rotation of the sequence TTSTTTS  which adds up to the octave with all the T's being the same size and all the S's the being the same size, with the 'S's being smaller than the 'T's. In such a tuning, then the notes are connected together in a chain of seven fifths, all the same size (TTTS or a permutation of that) which makes it a Linear temperament with the tempered fifth as a generator.

Overview
In the ordinary diatonic scales the T's here are tones and the S's are semitones which are half, or approximately half the size of the tone. But in the more general regular diatonic tunings, the two steps can be of any relation within the range between T=171.43 (S=T) and T=240 (S=0) cents (fifth between 685.71 and 720). Note that regular diatonic tunings are not limited to the notes of the diatonic scale which defines them.

One may determine the corresponding cents of S, T, and the fifth, given one of the values:
S = (1200-(T*5))/2
T = (1200-(S*2))/5
The fifth = (T+1200)/2

When the S's reduce to zero (T=240 cents) the result is TTTTT or a five tone equal temperament. As the semitones get larger, eventually the steps are all the same size, and the result is in seven tone equal temperament (S=T=171.43).  These two end points are not included as regular diatonic tunings, because to be regular the pattern of large and small steps has to be preserved, but everything in between is included, however small the semitones are, or however similar they are to the whole tones.

"Regular" here is understood in the sense of a mapping from Pythagorean diatonic such that all the interval relationships are preserved. For instance, in all regular diatonic tunings, just as for the pythagorean diatonic:
 The notes are connected together through a chain of six fifths reduced to the octave, or equivalently, through ascending fifths and descending fourths (e.g. F, C, G, D, A, E, B, in C major).
 A chain of two equal sized fifths (reduced to the octave) generates a tone (e.g. C G D)
 A chain of five fourths generates a semitone in the same way (e.g. E, A, D, G, C, F)
 A chain of four equal sized fifths (E.g.  C, G, D, A, E) generates a major third consisting of two whole tones
 A chain of three fourths generates a minor third (A, D, G, C)
and so on; in all those examples the result is reduced to the octave.

If one continues to increase the size of the S further, so that it is larger than the T, one gets scales with two large steps and five small steps, and eventually, when all the T's vanish the result is SS, so a tritone division of the octave. These scales however are not included as regular diatonic tunings.

All regular diatonic tunings are also linear temperaments, i.e. Regular temperaments with two generators: the octave and the tempered fifth. One can use the tempered fourth as an alternative generator (e.g. as B E A D G C F, ascending fourths, reduced to the octave), but the tempered fifth is the more usual choice.

All regular diatonic tunings are also Generated collections (also called Moments of Symmetry) and the chain of fifths can be continued in either direction to obtain a twelve tone system F C G D A E B F# C# G# D# A# where the interval F#-G is the same as B - C etc., another moment of symmetry with two interval sizes. A chain of seven fifths generates a chromatic semitone, for instance from F to F# and the pattern of chromatic and diatonic semitones is CDCDDCDCDCDD or a permutation of it where the C is the chromatic semitone, and D is the diatonic semitone e.g. from E to F between notes five steps apart in the cycle. Here, the seven equal system is the limit as the chromatic semitone tends to zero, and the five tone system in the limit as the diatonic semitone tends to zero.

Range of recognizability

The regular diatonic tunings include all linear temperaments within Easley Blackwood's "Range of Recognizability" in his The Structure of Recognizable Diatonic Tunings for diatonic tunings with
 the fifth tempered to between 4/7 and 3/5 of an octave;
 the major and minor seconds both positive; 
 the major second larger than the minor second.
However, his "range of recognizability" is more restrictive than "regular diatonic tuning". For instance, he requires the diatonic semitone to be at least 25 cents in size. See  for a summary.

Significant regions within the range

When the fifths are a little flatter than the 700 cents of the diatonic subset of 12 tone equal temperament, then we are in the region of the historical meantone tunings, which distribute or temper out the syntonic comma. They include

 1/3 comma meantone - achieves pure minor thirds 6/5; fifth is 694.786 cents; closely approximated by the diatonic scale in 19 tone equal temperament
 1/4 comma meantone - achieves pure major thirds 5/4 (386.313 cents); fifth is 696.6 cents; closely approximated in 31 tone equal temperament
 1/6 comma meantone - achieves a rational diatonic tritone 45/32; fifth is 698.371 cents; closely approximated in 55 tone equal temperament
 1/11 comma meantone - fifth is 699.99988 cents; almost indistinguishable from 12 tone equal temperament

When the fifths are exactly 3/2, or around 702 cents, the result is the Pythagorean diatonic tuning.

For fifths slightly narrower than 3/2, the result is a Schismatic temperament, where the temperament is measured in terms of a fraction of a schisma - the amount by which a chain of eight fifths reduced to an octave is sharper than the just minor sixth 8/5. So for instance, a 1/8 schisma temperament will achieve a pure 8/5 in an ascending chain of eight fifths. 53 tone equal temperament achieves a good approximation to Schismatic temperament.

At around 703.4-705.0 cents, with fifths mildly tempered in the wide direction, the result is major thirds with ratios near 14/11 (417.508 cents) and minor thirds around 13/11 (289.210 cents).

At 705.882 cents, with fifths tempered in the wide direction by 3.929 cents, the result is the diatonic scale in 17 tone equal temperament. Beyond this point, the regular major and minor thirds approximate simple ratios of numbers with prime factors 2-3-7, such as the 9/7 or septimal major third (435.084 cents) and 7/6 or septimal minor third (266.871 cents). At the same time, the regular tones more and more closely approximate a large 8/7 tone (231.174 cents), and regular minor sevenths the "harmonic seventh" at the simple ratio of 7/4 (968.826 cents). This septimal range extends out to around 711.111 cents or 27 tone equal temperament, or a bit further.

That leaves the two extremes, what we could call:
 the "inframeantone" range with fifths between the lower bound for the regular diatonic of 7 tone equal temperament (685.7143 cents) and the range of historical meantones beginning around 1/3-comma or 19 tone equal temperament (694.786 cents), and with the diatonic "semitones" approaching the size of the diatonic whole tone
 the "ultraseptimal" range from around 712 cents all the way to the upper bound of the regular diatonic at 720 cents or 5 tone equal temperament, and with very small diatonic semitones

Diatonic scales constructed in equal temperaments can have fifths either wider or narrower than a just 3/2. Here are a few examples:

 15, 17, 22, have fifths wider than a just 3/2
 12 (and its multiples), 19, 31, 53, have fifths narrower than a just 3/2

Syntonic temperament and timbre

The term syntonic temperament describes the combination of 
 the continuum of tunings in which the tempered perfect fifth (P5) is the generator and the octave is the period; 
 Comma sequences that start with the syntonic comma (i.e., in which the syntonic comma is tempered to zero, making the generated major third as wide as two generated major seconds); and 
 the "tuning range" of P5 temperings in which the generated minor second is neither larger than the generated major second, nor smaller than the unison. 

This combination is necessary and sufficient to define a set of relationships among tonal intervals that is invariant across the syntonic temperament's tuning range. Hence, it also defines an invariant mapping -- all across the tuning continuum -- between (a) the notes at these (pseudo-Just) generated tonal intervals, and (b) the corresponding partials of a similarly-generated pseudo-Harmonic timbre. Hence, the relationship between the syntonic temperament and its note-aligned timbres can be seen as a generalization of the special relationship between Just Intonation and the Harmonic Series.

Maintaining an invariant mapping between notes and partials, across the entire tuning range, enables Dynamic tonality, a novel expansion of the framework of tonality, which includes timbre effects such as primeness, conicality, and richness, and tonal effects such as polyphonic tuning bends and dynamic tuning progressions.

If one considers the syntonic temperament's tuning continuum as a string, and individual tunings as beads on that string, then one can view much of the traditional microtonal literature as being focused on the differences among the beads, whereas the syntonic temperament can be viewed as being focused on the commonality along the string.

The notes of the syntonic temperament are best played using the Wicki-Hayden note layout. Because the syntonic temperament and the Wicki-Hayden note-layout are generated using the same generator and period, they are isomorphic with each other; hence, the Wicki-Hayden note-layout is an isomorphic keyboard for the syntonic temperament. The fingering-pattern of any given musical structure is the same in any tuning on the syntonic temperament's tuning continuum. The combination of an isomorphic keyboard and continuously variable tuning supports Dynamic tonality as described above.

As shown in the figure at right, the tonally valid tuning range of the syntonic temperament includes a number of historically important tunings, such as the currently popular 12-tone equal division of the octave (12-edo tuning, also known as 12-tone “equal temperament”), the meantone tunings, and Pythagorean tuning. Tunings in the syntonic temperament can be equal (12-edo, 31-edo), non-equal (Pythagorean, meantone), circulating, and Just.

The legend of Figure 2 (on the right side of the figure) shows a stack of P5s centered on D. Each resulting note represents an interval in the syntonic temperament with D as the tonic. The body of the figure shows how the widths (from D) of these intervals change as the width of the P5 is changed across the syntonic temperament's tuning continuum.
 At P5 ≈ 685.7 cents , the intervals converge on just 7 widths (assuming octave equivalence of 0 and 1200 cents), producing 7-edo. S/T = 0.
 At P5 ≈ 694.7  (19-edo), the gaps between these 19 intervals are all equal, producing 19-edo tuning. S/T = 2/3.
 At P5 ≈ 696.8  (31-edo), a stack of 31 such intervals would show equal gaps between each such interval, producing 31-edo tuning. S/T = 3/5.
 At P5 = 700.0  (12-edo), the sharp notes and flat notes are equal, producing 12-edo tuning. S/T = 1/2.
 At P5 ≈ 701.9  (53-edo), a stack of 53 such intervals - each just 3/44 of a cent short of a pure fifth - makes 31 octaves, producing 53-edo tuning. S/T = 4/9.
 etc....
 at P5 = 720.0 cents , the pitches converge on just 5 widths, producing 5-edo. S/T = 1.

Research projects regarding the syntonic temperament 
 The research program Musica Facta  investigates the musical theory of the syntonic temperament.
 The music theory of the Guido 2.0 research project is based on the syntonic temperament. Guido 2.0 seeks to achieve a 10x increase in the efficiency of music education by exposing the invariant properties of music's syntonic temperament (octave invariance, transpositional invariance, tuning invariance, and fingering invariance) with geometric invariance. Guido 2.0 is the Music Education aspect of Musica Facta (above).

Notes 

Linear temperaments